Junji Yamauchi from the Hosei University, Koganei, Tokyo, Japan was named Fellow of the Institute of Electrical and Electronics Engineers (IEEE) in 2012 for contributions to electromagnetic waveguides and design of surface wave antennas.

References

Fellow Members of the IEEE
Living people
Year of birth missing (living people)
Place of birth missing (living people)